Mariusz Strzałka (born 27 March 1959) is a Polish fencer. He won a silver medal in the team épée event at the 1980 Summer Olympics. He later competed for Germany at the 1996 Summer Olympics, finishing 4th in the team épée event and 8th in the individual épée event.

References

1959 births
Living people
Polish male fencers
German male fencers
Olympic fencers of Poland
Olympic fencers of Germany
Fencers at the 1980 Summer Olympics
Fencers at the 1996 Summer Olympics
Olympic silver medalists for Poland
Olympic medalists in fencing
Sportspeople from Wrocław
Medalists at the 1980 Summer Olympics